Pinarophyllon is a genus of flowering plants belonging to the family Rubiaceae.

Its native range is Southeastern Mexico to Guatemala.

Species:

Pinarophyllon bullatum 
Pinarophyllon flavum

References

Rubiaceae
Rubiaceae genera